The chainback darter (Percina nevisense) is a species of freshwater ray-finned fish, a darter from the subfamily Etheostomatinae, part of the family Percidae, which also contains the perches, ruffes and pikeperches. It is found in North America where it occurs in the Roanoke-Chowan river drainage in Virginia south to the Neuse River drainage in North Carolina.  It prefers gravel runs and riffles of small to medium-sized rivers.

References

nevisense
Fish described in 1870
Taxa named by Edward Drinker Cope